Sea Control Squadron 29 (VS-29) or the "Dragonfires" was a former Sea Control and anti-submarine warfare (ASW) squadron of the US Navy that existed between 1960 and 2004.

History

As the Tromboners (1960–1975) 
VS-29 was originally commissioned on April 1, 1960 as the Tromboners by splitting VS-21 in two, the squadron making 12 small deployments in the East Pacific between July 1960 and May 1964 aboard the aircraft carrier  as part of CVSG-53  which included the recovery of the NASA Mercury capsules. From June 19, 1964 to December 16, 1964, they made their first Vietnam War cruise on Kearsarge with Grumman S-2F Trackers followed by three more Vietnam cruises on the carrier in 1966, 1968 and 1969.

First years of using the S-3 Viking (1975–1982) 

USS Carl Vinson and CVW-15 (1983–1990) 
After a shakedown cruise in 1982, VS-29 made history by joining the nuclear-powered carrier  on her maiden deployment, a round the world cruise from Norfolk, Virginia to NAS Alameda, California. Seven more deployments followed which included taking part in the RIMPAC 1984 and RIMPAC 1986 naval exercises. On July 31, 1990, the squadron returned from their last cruise with CVW-15 and the S-3A Viking.

CVW-11 and final years (1991–2004) 
This was the first deployment that VS-29 deployed with the S-3B Viking.

Three more deployments to the Persian Gulf followed for VS-29 between 1992 and 1995 aboard Abraham Lincoln followed by one Persian Gulf deployment between 1996 and 1997 on Kitty Hawk. After moving with CVW-11 back to Carl Vinson, VS-29 took part in RIMPAC '98 before deploying to the Persian Gulf in November 1998. During this deployment, Operation Desert Fox took place with VS-29 delivering  of fuel to CVW-11 twenty aircraft strike force from Carl Vinson.

During Operation Enduring Freedom in 2001, they became the first Viking squadron to be used in combat during the conflict.

References

Anti-submarine squadrons of the United States Navy
Sea control squadrons of the United States Navy